Bel Aire is a former unincorporated community, now incorporated in Tiburon in Marin County, California. It lies at an elevation of 20 feet (6 m).

References

Neighborhoods in Tiburon, California